Fall River station (Fall River Depot) is an under-construction MBTA Commuter Rail station in Fall River, Massachusetts. The station is being constructed as part of the South Coast Rail project and is expected to open in late 2023.

History

Former station
The Fall River Railroad opened from Myricks to Fall River on June 9, 1845, and to the Old Colony Railroad at South Braintree in December 1846. They merged as the Old Colony and Fall River Railroad in 1854. As the Old Colony and Newport Railway, it opened a line from Fall River south to Newport, Rhode Island in 1864. The Dighton and Somerset Railroad opened in 1866, joining the Fall River mainline at Somerset Junction, north of Fall River.

Bowenville station opened in the north part of Fall River around 1870. The railroad changed names again to become the Old Colony Railroad in 1872. The Old Colony constructed a station building at Bowenville, located on the east side of the tracks between Turner Street and Old Colony Street, in 1874. An extension of the Providence, Warren and Bristol Railroad opened over the new Slade's Ferry Bridge on December 5, 1875, connecting to the Fall River mainline north of Bowenville.

A new station designed by Bradford Gilbert opened in 1892 between Lincoln Avenue and Pearce Street, just north of the existing Bowenville station. Named Fall River, it became the main station for the city. The station was raised  as part of a 1902–1905 project that eliminated eleven grade crossings in the city.

Service to Providence, and to Taunton over the Dighton and Somerset, both ended in 1932. Newport service ended in 1938 due to the 88 stations case;  Ferry Street station was closed until around 1950, leaving Fall River as a terminal. Fall River service was suspended from 1949 to 1952, and ultimately ended on September 5, 1958.

South Coast Rail 

In September 2008, MassDOT released 18 potential station sites for the South Coast Rail project, including Fall River Depot off Davol Street. A 2009 conceptual design called for a single  side platform serving the west track, with a second track allowing freight trains to pass the high-level platform; a two-story parking deck would be located on the west side of the tracks. Plans released as part of the Final Environmental Impact Report in 2013 were nearly identical. A 2009 corridor plan called for mixed-use transit-oriented development around the new station. On June 11, 2010, the state took ownership of the Fall River Subdivision and several other CSX lines as part of a sale agreement.

In 2017, the project was re-evaluated due to cost issues. A new proposal released in March 2017 called for early service via Middleborough by 2024, followed by full service via Stoughton by 2029. The January 2018 Draft Supplemental Environmental Impact Report reconfigured the planned parking lot configuration, as part of the previously planned deck site had been developed for use by a business. A parking lot on the west side of the tracks will be constructed during Phase 1, with a possible eastern lot (on the site of an existing retail structure) to be added later.

The MBTA awarded a $159 million contract for construction of the Fall River Secondary portion of the project, including Fall River station, in May 2020. Service was then planned to begin in November 2023. Two former industrial buildings were demolished in 2020 to make room for the station and its parking lot. The station was 32% complete by February 2022, with 96% of platform foundations and some retaining walls in place. Construction of the station reached 90% completion in October 2022, with the platform and canopies in place. Substantial completion of the Fall River Secondary work was announced in December 2022, with revenue service still planned for late 2023.

References

External links

MBTA Commuter Rail stations in Bristol County, Massachusetts
Railway stations scheduled to open in 2023
Buildings and structures in Fall River, Massachusetts
Railway stations opened in 1892
Railway stations closed in 1958
Under-construction MBTA Commuter Rail stations